Roçəhməd (also, Rochakhmed) is a village and the least populous municipality in the Balakan Rayon of Azerbaijan.  It has a population of 428.  The municipality consists of the villages of Roçəhməd, Murtuztala, and Əyritala.

References 

Populated places in Balakan District